Luigi Di Lello (born 31 May 1968) is an Italian male retired marathon runner, which participated at the 1995 World Championships in Athletics in Gothenburg, Sweden.

Achievements

References

External links

1968 births
Italian male marathon runners
World Athletics Championships athletes for Italy
Living people
Italian male long-distance runners